Gébuin (or Jubin) was an archbishop of Lyon who served 1077 to 1082.

Biography
A native of Loraine, there he was a canon of Langres in 1059 and archdeacon, 1068.
He succeeds Umberto II in 1077, supported by the papal legate and future successor Hugh of Die, and is canonically elected at a council meeting in Autun by the church representative of Lyon.

In 1079, he traveled to Rome and Pope Gregory VII receives a papal bull of 19 April 1079 granting (or confirming) the primacy of the Archbishop of Lyon on four ecclesiastical provinces of Lyon, Sens, Rouen and  Tours.

As Primate he tried to make  the clergy in Tours  relinquish property that had been acquired unjustly. However he met with resistance and delay by the clergy of that diocese.
In 1080 1 Gébuin gives the church of Boisse with all his parish, and two chaplaincies, to the order of Saint-Ruf, who established a priory. The same year, he donated the church of Saint-Oyen Meillonnas, the Saint-Pierre church of religious

He is considered to be a Catholic saint; on his feast day is 18 April1.

References

French saints
Archbishops of Lyon
11th-century French people
Year of birth unknown
Year of death unknown